Pet Sounds in the Key of Dee is a mashup album by United Kingdom-based record producer Bullion, released for free online download in 2007. It is a tribute to American rapper/producer J Dilla and the Beach Boys' 1966 album Pet Sounds.  According to hip hop producer Questlove, Dilla had been a fan of the Pet Sounds album.

Reception
Gorilla vs. Bear described it as a "more adventurous version of The Grey Album, but with J Dilla and the Beach Boys standing in for Jay-Z and the Beatles". Pitchfork called it "a surprisingly deft, quasi-mash-up record", while The Guardian wrote that the album "highlighted the beauty of the music by chopping it up into byte-size chunks and putting it back together in fabulous new shapes". In 2013, Fact magazine placed Pet Sounds in the Key of Dee in its list of the essential instrumental hip hop albums of the last 15 years.

Track listing

References

2007 remix albums
Mashup albums
Self-released albums
The Beach Boys tribute albums
Unofficial remix albums